Lemi may refer to the following people:
Given name
Lemi Berhanu Hayle (born 1994), Ethiopian long-distance runner
Lemi Ghariokwu (born 1955), Nigerian artist, illustrator and designer
Lemi Ponifasio, Samoan and New Zealand director, artist, dancer, designer and choreographer

Surname
David Lemi (born 1982), Samoan rugby player
Teddese Lemi (born 1999), Ethiopian middle-distance runner